Orthogonius nepalensis is a species of ground beetle in the subfamily Orthogoniinae. It was described by Habu in 1979.

References

nepalensis
Beetles described in 1979